The AAA Championships was an annual track and field competition organised by the Amateur Athletic Association of England. It was the foremost domestic athletics event in the United Kingdom during its lifetime, despite the existence of the official UK Athletics Championships organised by the then governing body for British athletics, the British Athletics Federation between 1977 and 1993, and again in 1997. It was succeeded by the British Athletics Championships, organised by the BEF's replacement/successor, UK Athletics under its brand name British Athletics.

History
The competition was founded in 1880, replacing the Amateur Athletic Club (AAC) Championships, which had been held since 1866. Initially a men-only competition, a Women's AAA Championships was introduced in 1922 with the first proper WAAA Championships in 1923 and organised by the Women's Amateur Athletics Association until 1992, at which point it was folded into the Amateur Athletics Association. During the 1920s and early 1930s, the AAA Championships was Europe's most prestigious athletics event until the European Athletics Championships were inaugurated in 1934. Events were contested and measured in imperial units until metrification in 1969, in line with international standards.

Though organised by the English governing body, it was open to athletes from all over the world. The first overseas champion was Lon Myers of the United States who won the 440 yards in 1881. the first winner from Africa was Arthur Wharton from Ghana who won the 100 yards in 1886 and 1887. Foreign champions out-numbered those from the United Kingdom for the first time in 1904 when the United States team on their way to Paris for the Olympic Games stopped off in London and won eight of the fourteen events then on the programme.

It served as the de facto British Championships, given the absence of such a competition for most of its history. It was typically held over two or three days over a weekend in July or August. Foreign athletes were no longer allowed to compete from 1998 onwards (with the change first being trialled in 1996), though they were still allowed to participate (but not formally placed) in the 10,000 m and marathon events.

The creation of the UK Athletics Championships in 1977 under the British Amateur Athletic Board (later British Athletics Federation) marked a challenge to the event's domestic supremacy, though the quality of that rival event declined after it hosted the 1980 Olympic trials and it ceased as an annual championships after 1993, closing completely after 1997. The AAA Championships incorporated the UK Olympic trials every four years from 1988 to 2004. The women's WAAA Championships was folded into the AAA Championships in 1988.

The establishment of UK Athletics in 1999 to serve as the national governing body for professional, elite athletics ultimately started the decline of the AAA Championships. UK Athletics took over the role of both national championships and international team selection with its own British Athletics Championships from 2007 onwards. The AAA Championships ceased to be a stand-alone event in its own right from that point onwards, though it re-emerged in 2016 in being co-held with the English Athletics Championships organised by England Athletics (a body for developing the grassroots level beneath UK Athletics).

The long-distance track events, marathon, racewalking events and combined track and field events were regularly held outside of the main track and field championship competition. Although the competition venue varied over the years, there were several locations that served as regular hosts over its history: Stamford Bridge (1886 to 1931), White City Stadium (1932 to 1970), Crystal Palace National Sports Centre (1971 to 1987) and Alexander Stadium (1984 to 2003).

Evolution of Events
In 1880 the programme consisted of fourteen events; 100 yards, 440 yards, 880 yards, 1 mile, 4 miles, 10 miles, steeplechase, 120 yards hurdles, high jump, pole vault, long jump, shot put, hammer and a 7 miles walk.

The 220 yards was first held in 1902. In 1911 a 1 mile medley relay was introduced consisting of legs of 220 yards, 220 yards, 440 yards and 880 yards. This was not usually held at the main championship. In 1911 it was held in conjunction with the AAA Cycling Championships at Manchester on 29 July. In 1927 this was replaced by a 4 x 440 yards relay and a 4 x 110 yards relay was introduced at the same time.

In 1914 the 440 yards hurdles, discus, javelin, and triple jump, known at the time as Hop, Step & Jump, were introduced to the championship.

The 4 miles race was replaced by a 3 miles and 6 miles in 1932.

The 10 miles was held, apart from a break during the First World War, every year until 1939. It was held in 1947, and resumed annually from 1958 to 1972.

The marathon became a AAA Championship event in 1925. For the first three years it was held in conjunction with the race promoted by Polytechnic Harriers on a course from Windsor Castle to Stamford Bridge. Then from 1928 it was staged as a separate event at a number of different venues. From 1983 it has been incorporated into the London marathon.

The distance of the steeplechase was standardised at 2 miles from 1913, and the number of hurdles was standardised from 1931. 

A 220 yards hurdles event was held from 1952 to 1962.

Until April 1922 it was permissible under AAA rules to move the hands up the pole during the pole vault, in what was known at the time as the "climbing" technique. The event was officially known as the pole jump until 1931.

In 1880 and 1881 a 7 foot circle was used for the shot put, and from 1882 to 1907 competitions were held from a 7 foot square. The circle was re-introduced in 1908 and from 1912 onwards a stop-board was used at the front of the circle.

For the hammer throw, from 1880 to 1886 AAA regulations required a 7 foot circle to be used although in 1881 the Field reports that throws were taken with a 7 ft run. From 1887 to 1905 throws were made from a 9 foot square. The 7 foot circle was re-introduced in 1908. Wire handles were legalised in 1896.

In 1920 only, a competition for throwing a 56lb weight was held.

The decathlon was first held in 1928, but it was not repeated until 1936.

A 7 miles walk was held from 1880 to 1893 when it was replaced by a 4 miles walk. In 1901 the 4 miles walk was replaced by a 2 miles walk and the 7 miles walk. The walking events were generally but not always held at the main championship.

Races were contested, and field events measured, in yards and feet up until 1968. A men's 3000 metres was contested from 1989 to 1999. 

On the women's side, the 2000 metres steeplechase was held in 2002 and 2003 before moving to the standard 3000 m distance. The 80 metres hurdles was contested until 1968 before being replaced by the new international standard 100 metres hurdles. The women's 200 metres hurdles was on the programme from 1961 to 1972. A 60 metres event was available from 1935 to 1950.

Challenge Cups
On 4 April 1880 a meeting of representatives of the chief athletic clubs in the country was held at Oxford for the purpose of forming a governing body possessing the power of framing the laws and regulations of (track and field) athletics. The Amateur Athletic Association was the result. At that meeting the representatives of the Amateur Athletic Club handed over to the new association the challenge cups that had been competed for since the championship meeting was instituted in 1866. There were intitally just nine cups, shown with their notional insurance value, as follows: 100 yards - Challenge Cup presented by Prince Hassan, 60 guineas. Prince Hassan was the brother of Tewfik Pasha the Khedive of Egypt, and was educated in England. 440 yards - Challenge Cup presented by Kenelm Thomas Digby, Esq., MP, 45 guineas, an Irish politician. 880 yards - Challenge Cup presented by Percy Melville Thornton, 45 guineas. Thornton was the son of Rear-Admiral Samuel Thornton. Educated at Harrow, an Oxford graduate, he won the AAC 880 yards in 1866, was the first Secretary of the Inter-University sports, inspired the boat race near Ghent in 1911 between 8 Jesus college oarsmen and a Belgian crew. Was Honorary Secretary Middlesex County Cricket Club for many years, an MP for the Clapham division of Battersea from 1892-1910. Married his cousin Florence Emily Sykes and wrote a book on Foreign Secretaries of the Nineteenth Century. 1 mile - Challenge Cup presented by Charles Bennett Lawes Esq. From Teignmouth, Devon, Lawes, went to Eton, and Trinity College, Cambridge University. He won the AAC 1 mile championship in 1866. 1st President Incorporated Society of British Sculptors. 4 miles - Challenge Cup presented by the Early of Jersey, 60 guineas. At the Oxford vs Cambridge match in 1865 he was fourth in the 2 miles, in a blinding snowstorm. The following year he was third in a 1 mile race won by Arthur Kemble in a howling gale. He was first President of the AAA. 10 miles - Challenge Cup presented by Walter Moresby Chinnery of the London Athletic Club, 50 guineas. Chinnery was the first amateur to run 1 mile in less than four and a half minutes, which he did at Cambridge on 10 March 1868, and on 30 May that year he repeated the feat at Beaufort House. In 1868 and 1869 he won both the 1 mile and 4 miles events at the AAC championship, and he again won the 1 mile in 1871. High jump - Challenge Cup presented by Sir Claude Champion de Crespigny, 3rd Baronet, 35 guineas. 120 yards hurdles  - Challenge Cup presented by Lord Southwell, 45 guineas. 7 miles walk - Challenge Cup presented by John Chambers, founder and secretary of the AAC, 35 guineas.

Editions

Most successful athletes by event

See also
List of British athletics champions

References

Editions
AAA Championships. Power of 10. Retrieved 2018-02-25.

External links
BRITISH ATHLETICS CHAMPIONSHIPS 1876-1914
BRITISH ATHLETICS CHAMPIONSHIPS 1919-1939
BRITISH ATHLETICS CHAMPIONSHIPS 1945-1959

 
Defunct athletics competitions
Athletics competitions in England
Recurring sporting events established in 1880
Recurring sporting events disestablished in 2006
National championships in the United Kingdom
National athletics competitions
Defunct sports competitions in England
1880 establishments in England
2006 disestablishments in England